Ceanothus dentatus is a species of shrub in the family Rhamnaceae known by the common name sandscrub ceanothus. It is endemic to California, where it is known only from the Central Coast and its Coast Ranges. It grows in coastal hills, bluffs, and canyons.

Description
This shrub produces a highly branched, spreading stem up to about 1.5 meters tall. The evergreen leaves are alternately arranged and often borne in clusters. Each is under 2 centimeters long, toothed along the edges, wavy and turned under along the margins to appear somewhat ruffled. They are hairy and covered in tiny glandular bumps, the upper surfaces dark shiny green and the undersides paler. The inflorescence is a small cluster of many bright blue flowers. The fruit is a lobed, crested capsule about 4 millimeters wide.

References

External links
Jepson Manual Treatment
USDA Plants Profile
Photo gallery

dentatus
Endemic flora of California
Natural history of the California chaparral and woodlands
Natural history of the California Coast Ranges
Plants described in 1838
Taxa named by Asa Gray
Taxa named by John Torrey